Václav Kaplický  (28 August 1895, Sezimovo Ústí – 4 October 1982, Prague) was a Czech writer, journalist and epic poet. He is most known as an author of historical fiction.

Kaplický studied at Gymnasium in Tábor, finishing in 1914. In 1915 he was sent to the front in Galicia where he was taken captive (1916). Later he joined the Czechoslovak Legion. For his political opinions he was imprisoned by the legion and labeled as a traitor. After returning to Czechoslovakia in 1921  he worked in civil service. During the period 1922–1950, Kaplický worked in several publishing houses associated with the Czechoslovak Socialist Party. From 1950 he dedicated his time solely to writing.

The majority of Kaplický's works are historical fictions spanning the period from the Hussite Wars in the 15th century to the revolutionary upheaval of 1848. His novel Kladivo na čarodějnice (1963), about witch trials in northern Moravia during the 1670s is the best known because it served as the basis for movie by Otakar Vávra (Malleus Maleficarum, also translated as Witches' Hammer or Witchhammer).

Works

Historical fiction
 Kraj kalicha, 1945 – about Hussite period
 Čtveráci, 1952 – about peasant uprising 1618–1620 
 Železná koruna (2 volumes), 1954 – about hard life of common people after Thirty Years' War
 Smršť, 1955 
 Rekruti, 1956 
 Listy z kronik, 1958 – five short historical stories from northern Bohemia 
 Zaťatá pěst, 1959 
 Kladivo na čarodějnice, 1963 – about witch trials in northern Moravia
 Táborská republika (3 volumes), 1969 – about Hussite period 
 Nalezeno právem, 1971 – about accusation of a Jew from ritual murder in 1687
 Škůdce zemský Jiří Kopidlanský, 1976 – from period of dynasty of Jagellon 
 Veliké theatrum, 1977 – about earliest phase of Thirty Years' War and preparations to Battle of White Mountain
 Kdo s koho, 1979 – from period of dynasty of Jagellon
 Život alchymistův, 1980 – life of alchemist Edward Kelley

For youths
 O věrnosti a zradě, 1959 – 15 short historical stories
 Bandita, Paťara a spol., 1969 – for boys
 Královský souboj, 1971

Other
 Gornostaj, finished in 1921, published in 1936 – autobiographic novel about the imprisonment of dissenting legionnaires near Vladivostok, on an island in Gornostai Bay (ru:)
 Dobří přátelé, 1961 – about love of nature
 Ani tygři, ani lvi, 1966 – short stories about pet animals 
 Od města k městu, 1975 – wandering of students throughout Czech lands 
 Hrst vzpomínek z mládí, 1988 – first part of Kaplický's memoirs, edited by Jaromíra Nejedlá
 Hrst vzpomínek z dospělosti, 2010 – second part of memoirs, edited by Martin Kučera

External links
 Short biography (in Czech)
 History of Kaplický's imprisonment (in Czech, archived link)

1895 births
1982 deaths
People from Sezimovo Ústí
People from the Kingdom of Bohemia
Czech novelists
Czech male novelists
Czech journalists
Czech poets
Czech male poets
Czech children's writers
Czechoslovak Legions in literature
20th-century Czech poets
20th-century Czech novelists
20th-century male writers
Austro-Hungarian military personnel of World War I
Czechoslovak Legion personnel
Burials at Vyšehrad Cemetery
20th-century journalists